Kalvarija is a city in southwestern Lithuania, located in the Marijampolė County, close to the border with Poland.

Etymology and names
Variants of the name include Kalvarijos, Kalvariya, Kalwarja, Kalvarye (Yiddish), Kalwaria (Polish), Kalvarien (German), Calvaria, Kalvaria, Kalwariya, and Kalwarya. The town is named so because it was established in the 17th century as a shrine commemorating the crucifixion of Jesus.

History

In 1705 the first wooden church was built. In 1713, local Jews received permission from King August II to build a synagogue and Jewish craftsmen were first permitted to practice their crafts without having to be members of the craft guilds. In 1791 Stanisław August Poniatowski recognized that Kalvarija had the right to call itself a town and confirmed the municipality's coat of arms. 1840 saw the construction of a new Catholic church, which still stands today. Kalvarija developed rapidly when the new St. Petersburg–Warsaw road was constructed toward the end of the 19th century. By the outbreak of World War I, Kalvarija had over 10,000 inhabitants; the destruction of two-thirds of the town during the war caused the population decline.

During World War II, Kalvarija was under German occupation from 22 June 1941 until 1 August 1944. It was administered as a part of the Generalbezirk Litauen of Reichskommissariat Ostland. In 1941, a mass execution of 38 Jews of the city was perpetrated by Gestapo soldiers and Lithuanian policemen.

International relations

Twin towns — Sister cities
Kalvarija is twinned with: 
  Alpago (formerly Pieve D’Alpago) in Italy
  Kalwaria Zebrzydowska in Poland

See also 
 Suwałki Gap

References
Notes

External links

 “Kalvarija” - Encyclopedia of Jewish Communities in Lithuania

 
Cities in Lithuania
Cities in Marijampolė County
Holocaust locations in Lithuania
Kalvarija Municipality
Municipalities administrative centres of Lithuania
Suwałki Governorate